The Thick of It is a British comedy television series that satirises the inner workings of modern government. It was first broadcast on BBC Four in 2005, switching to BBC Two for the third series. The Thick of It ran for 20 half-hour episodes and three special hour-long episodes, as well as a spin-off film, In the Loop, released in 2009.

Details
The first run of three episodes screened on BBC Four from 19 May 2005. A further three episodes were transmitted 20 October – 3 November 2005. The six episodes were repeated on BBC Two in early 2006, and later on BBC America together as a single series. The subsequent DVD release of all six episodes calls them The Complete First Series. An hour-long Christmas special, "The Rise of the Nutters", aired in January 2007 with a further ten episodes planned for later on in the year, however this did not occur. Instead, another one-off hour-long episode "Spinners and Losers" aired on 3 July 2007. It was followed by a 15-minute extra which was made available through BBC Red Button. 

For the belated Series 3, transmission switched to BBC Two, simulcast on BBC HD, with subsequent repeats on BBC Four. The series ran for eight episodes from 24 October 2009 to 12 December 2009 (several months after the release of a theatrical film based on the series, In the Loop). As a Red Button extra, each episode had an accompanying 10-minute documentary titled Out of The Thick of It broadcast immediately afterwards and on the BBC Comedy website, which featured cut scenes, specially written scenes and, later, discussion of the programme by the series' writers and makers and with figures involved in British politics. 

Another hiatus of several years followed the conclusion of Series 3, with Series 4 launching on BBC Two on 8 September 2012 and consisting of seven episodes, one of which was an hour long.

Series overview

Episodes

Series 1 (2005)

Series 2 (2005)
Some DVDs package these with Series 1 as a single six-episode series

Specials (2007)
Netflix includes these episodes in Series 2

Series 3 (2009)

Series 4 (2012)

Other media

In the Loop

In the Loop is a 2009 spin-off film by the makers of the series, starring many members of the same cast, albeit in different roles. The only actual returning characters are Malcolm Tucker, Jamie McDonald, and Malcolm's secretary Sam, played by Samantha Harrington. The film gained worldwide release, won widespread critical acclaim, and was nominated for an Academy Award for Best Writing (Adapted Screenplay).

Out of The Thick of It
Running concurrently with the third series of The Thick of It, the BBC also ran an online webisode series, entitled Out of The Thick of It, containing both short, new storylines, and deleted scenes, mainly starring Terri and Robyn. Later episodes also included interviews with the cast and crew. All of these episodes were included on the Series 3 DVD.

References

Thick of It, List of The
Episodes